Želeč is a municipality and village in Tábor District in the South Bohemian Region of the Czech Republic. It has about 1,000 inhabitants.

Administrative parts
The village of Bezděčín is an administrative part of Želeč.

References

Villages in Tábor District